This is a discography for electronic and experimental hip hop musician DJ Spooky. It lists studio albums, singles, EPs, collaborations, sideman appearances and albums released under his given name Paul D. Miller.

Albums
Necropolis (Knitting Factory Works KFW 185), March 1996
Songs of a Dead Dreamer (Asphodel Records 0961), April 1996
Synthetic Fury EP (Asphodel Records 0110), February 1998
Haunted Breaks Volumes I and II (Liquid Sky Music), October and December 1998
Riddim Warfare (Outpost-Geffen CD), September 1998; (Asphodel Records Vinyl), December 2002
Under the Influence (Six Degrees PRCD 1056-2) (DJ mix record), September 2001
Songs of a Dead Dreamer (2002 Edition) (Asphodel Records 2009), January 2002
Modern Mantra (Shadow/Instinct SDW 135-2) (DJ mix record), May 2002
Optometry (Thirsty Ear THI 57121.2), July 2002
DJ Spooky That Subliminal Kid vs. Twilight Circus Dub Sound System - Riddim Clash, 2004
Drums of Death DJ Spooky vs. Dave Lombardo (Thirsty Ear), April 2005
The Secret Song (Thirsty Ear), October 2009
Of Water and Ice (Jamendo), June 2013

Singles and EPs
Galactic Funk (Asphodel 101), 1997
Object Unknown (with remixes by DJ Spooky and Kut Masta Kurt) (Outpost/Geffen CD; Asphodel vinyl), August 1998
Peace in Zaire (with remixes by Ambassador Jr., and The Dub Pistols) promotional/White Label Only (Outpost/Geffen), April 1999
Subliminal Minded EP-Peace in Zaire Remixes (Bar None Records), October 1999
Catechism featuring Killah Priest (Synchronic), August 2002, SYC 002
Optometrix 12” (Thirsty Ear), June 2003, THI 57132.1

Labels
 Outpost-Geffen Records
 Trojan Records
 Thirsty Ear Records
 Asphodel Records

Paul D. Miller and miscellaneous albums
Death in Light of the Phonograph: Excursions into the Pre-linguistic Asphodel Records, September 1996, (limited edition) Originally accompanied installation at Annina Nosei Gallery.
The Viral Sonata Asphodel Records. Originally accompanied installation for The Whitney Biennial 1997
ftp>snd>untitled> Nest Magazine CD, accompanying November 2001 issue
Another Forensic Charade, accompanying catalogue to exhibition at Magasin 3, Stockholm, Sweden, September, December 2001 (limited edition)

Collaborative releases and mix records
Automaton: Dub Terror Exhaust (Strata), 1994
Template 12” DJ Spooky and Totemplow (Manifold Records), 1998
10” DJ Spooky and Alan Licht (Manifold Records), 1998
Kaotik : Transgression DJ Spooky and Totemplow (Manifold Records), June 1999
10” DJ Spooky and Arto Lindsay (Manifold Records), July 1999
10” DJ Spooky and Quoit (Manifold Records), 2000
10” DJ Spooky and Merzbow (Manifold Records), 2000
DJ Spooky vs. The Freight Elevator Quartet: File Under Futurism (Caipirinha Records), September 1999
The Quick and the Dead DJ Spooky and Scanner (Sulphur Records) Meld series, 2000-01-31, Cat No. MELCD001 (UK) BBWULCD004 (US)
Anodyne (Main, core and Peripheral mixes) Picture disk w/Sound Secretion (BSI Records) Cat. BSI 014-1, October 2000
 Cinemage by Ryuichi Sakamoto w/ David Sylvian, 2000.
Catechism (DJ Spooky w/Killah Priest) (Blue Juice Records/UK) BJ007, 2001-06-26
DJ Spooky: Under the Influence: A mix with Six Degrees Records, September 2001
Mondern Mantra: A label mix for Shadow Records, May 2002
Dubtometry featuring Mad Professor, Lee “Scratch” Perry, and others — a remix of “Optometry (Thirsty Ear), March 2003, THI 57128.2
Rhythm Science Audio Companion — C-Side: companion to Rhythm Science book, 2003
Riddim Clash with Twilight Circus (PLAY Label), April 2004
Celestial Mechanix: a label mix for Thirsty Ear Records, June 2004
DJ Spooky presents In Fine Style: 50,000 Volts of Trojan Records: a 2CD label mix for Trojan Records, June 2006
DJ Spooky presents Riddim Come Forward: 50,000 Volts of Trojan Records: a 2CD label mix for Trojan Records, UK release, October 2006
Creation Rebel (Trojan/Sanctuary), October 2007

Film scores
SLAM (Offline/Tri-Mark) Grand Prize winner, Sundance, 1998; Cannes, Camera D'Or, 1998; October 1998 commercial release.
Quattro Noza (Fountainhead Films) Sundance competition finalist, 2003

Multimedia, web and misc. projects
Stuzzicadenti DJ Spooky and Diego Cortez, May 2000
Marcel Duchamp remix, LA Museum of Contemp. Art, 2002

Remixes
Hooverphonic – "2Wicky" Epic
Spookey Ruben – "Incidental Drift Mix" TVT Records
DJ Krush – "Ryuki" (Lulu's Peace Mix) TVT Records
Ben Neill – "Pentagram: La Mer Mix and Undertow Mix" (Verve Antilles) 1996
Ben Neill – "Sistrum into Grapheme" Astralwerks
James Plotkin Sawtooth Swirl "DJ Spooky's Irreducible Gated Momentum Dub Mix" (9:40), 1997 (Rawkus ptv 1136-2)
Walter Ruttman's Weekend for Engaged Magazine Vol. 6, London, UK
Hovercraft Stereo Specific Polymerization "Mad Psychotic Hyper-Accelerated Lower East Side Mix" (5:57)
Earth Crooked Axis for String Quartet "Kool Stereo Arc" Dub Mix (8:42)
Arto Lindsay – "Mundo Civilizado Inversion Mix" 7:28, Gramavision, June 1997, GLP 79519
Metallica – For Whom the Bell Tolls "The Irony Of It All" 4:41 for Spawn Soundtrack, Immortal/Epic Records, New Line Cinema; August 1997, EK68494
Sublime – "Doin' Time" (Life Sentence Remix) 5:43 MCA Records; September 1997
Free Kitten – Jam #1 "Spatialized Chinatown Express Mix" (6:24), Kill Rock Stars, November 1997. KRS 286
Nick Cave – "Red Right Hand" for Scream 2 soundtrack Capitol Records, December 1997
The Swirlies – "In Harmony: DJ Spooky's Retrograde Transposition Mix" (6:15) Taang! Records
Bally Sagoo – Tum Bin Jiya "Isomorphic Flux Mix" 6:47 Higher Ground/Sony
Skeleton Key – "Wide Open" (DJ Spooky's Full Spectrum Mix) Capitol Records
KoЯn – "Got the Life" Immortal/Epic, November 1998 (Limited Edition)
Cibo Matto – "Swords and Paintbrush" Warner Bros., 1999
Steve Reich – "City Life" Coalition/None Such Recordings, March 1999
Show Lee Netsu: Electro: snd>>cd: zero sum mix BMG Funhouse (Japan) BVCR-11015, October 1999
Hydroponic Sound System Routine Insanity/Evolution Records, September 2000
Kahimi Karie Tilt Polydor KK Records (Japan), 2000
"Rock the Nation" (DJ Spooky sound Unbound instrumental remix) with Michael Franti and Spearhead (Six Degrees Records), 2001
Merzbow – Ikebana Merzbow Important Records, 2003
Meat Beat Manifesto - "Storm The Studio R.M.X.S." Tino Corp., September 2003
Sub Rosa Revisited, a catalog mix. Sub Rosa SR 201, November 2003
Yoko Ono – "Rising" on "Yes, I'm a Witch" Astralwerks 2007
Bob Marley - "Mr. Brown" Creation Rebel 2007
Sagol 59 - "Leeches Remix" JDub Records 2008

Tracks on compilations, soundtracks and miscellaneous releases
"Galactic Funk" on This is Home Entertainment (Home Entertainment Records/Liquid Sky Music)
"Hologrammic Dub" on The Night Shift, 1996 (C&S Records)
"Surface Noise" (Theme of the Hungry Ghost), Sonic Soul Records 001,1996
"Fourth Inversion" on The Resonance Found at the Core of the Bubble, 1996 (Bubble Core Records)
"Prologue (The Duchamp Effect)" on Mind The Gap 15 Gozno Circus GC021, 1997
"Muzique Mecanique Dub" and "Muzique Psychotique" on Electric Ladyland Vol. 3 (Force X Records).
"Vorticities" on State Of the Union, 1996 (Atatvistic Records)
"Step In Stand Clear" on Storm of Drones (Sombient)
"Temporally Displaced", also on Offbeat
Collaboration with Amiri Baraka on Black Dada Nihilismus on Offbeat: A Red Hot Sound Trip, 1996, Red Hot/Whitney Museum/Wax Trax-TVT compilation released in conjunction with The Whitney Museum's "The Beats: A Retrospective" installation.
In Visual Ocean on Gilles Deleuze: In Memoriam (Mille Plateaux Records)
"The Nasty Data Burst" & "Journey" (Paraspace Mix) on Valis: The Destruction of Syntax (Subharmonic Records)
"Machinic Phylum" (Crippled Symmetries Mix) on Future Audio, 1996 (Freeze Records)
"Primary Inversion" on This is Home Entertainment 2, 1996 (Liquid Sky Music/Jungle Sky Records HE 008)
"Black Djinn Trance" (w/Bill Laswell, Jah Wobble) on War Smash Hits, 1996 (Sub Rosa Records SR 105)
"Zero Gravity Dub" on Synthetic Pleasures Vol. 2 Caipirinha Productions, 1997
"Soon Forward, Anansi's Gambit" (DJ Spooky's On the Island of the Lost Souls Mix), and "Why Patterns" on Incursions in Illbient, 1997 (Asphodel 0968)
"Island Of Lost Souls" on The Freestyle Files, 1997, Studio K7 (Germany)
The Western Lands (A Dangerous Road Mix) w/ William Burroughs, Bill Laswell, etc. on Material; Seven Souls, 1997, (Triloka/Mercury 314 534 905)
Iannis Xenakis: Analogiques A + B on Ianissimo! (w/STX Ensemble), 1997 (Vandenburg Wave VAN 0003)
Iannis Xenakis: Kraanerg (w STX Ensemble), 1997 (Asphodel 0975)
Discord w/ Ryuichi Sakamoto, David Torn and orchestra. Live in Japan, 1997 (Güt/For Life FLCG 3028)
"Object Unknown", "Pandemonium", and "Degree Zero Launch" CD-ROM (The Product), 1998
"Reconstruction and The 6th Degree", 1998 on Electric Ladyland 5 (Mille Plateau 48)
"He Who Leaves No Trace" for Invisible Soundtracks (Leaf Records)
"Solar Physics" DJ Spooky and Sir Menelik for Rawkus Records
"Polymorphia 2000: Ill Konceptual Mix" for Kunsthalle, Vienna
"Haunted: Ill Konceptual Mix" for Kunsthaus, Zurich
"Reciprocal Presupposition; Seuqigolana" (Suntropic Inversion Mix) for The End of Utopia (Sub Rosa/SR132), 1998
"Stereo Specific Polymerization" (Beneath the Underdog Mix) (Word Sound Records) 10", 1998
"Interlude" DJ Spooky and Vinicius Cantuaria for Onda Sonora (Red Hot and Lisbon)
"Soon Forward, Synaptic Dissonance" for Asphodelic (Asphodel), 1999
"Turn Table Eyzd, UMM" for Hi-Fidelity Dub Chapter II Guidance Recordings GDRC-575), January 2000
"Conduit 23" for “Wreck This Mess Remission 2” Noise Museum
"Reciprocal Presupposition and Dance of the Morlocks" on '"Condo Painting'" soundtrack Gallery Six Records, April, 2000
"Rapper’s Relight" on one:it’s all good, man Saul Goodman records, February 2001
"Another Forensic Charade" on Electric Ladyland — Clickhop Version 1.0 Mille Plateaux Records, 2001
"If/When" on Scissors (Play label/Japan; Play 002), June 2001
"FTP>Bundle / Conduit 23" on An Anthology of Noise & Electronic Music (Sub Rosa/SR 190), April 2002
"Catechism" (instrumental) (Blue Juice Records/UK) BJCD013, September 2002
"That Subliminal Kid vs. The Last Mohican" on Thirsty Ear Presents The Blue Series Sampler (The Shape of Jazz to Come) (Thirsty Ear), 2003
"Strictly Turtableyzed Hmm.." on Hi-Fidelity Dub Sessions (Guidance Recordings), 2004

Sideman appearances
Arto Lindsay – Mundo Civilizado, 1996, For Life/Ryko/Bar None
Pilgrimage – 9 Songs of Ecstasy, 1997, Point Music 314 536 201-2/4
Ben Neill – The Gold Bug, 1998, Antilles Records
Gary Lucas Golgothaon "Improve the Shining Hour" Knitting Factory, 2000
Lost Objects w/Bang on a Can, Concerto Köln, RIAS Kammerchor Teldec Classics, Germany 8573-84107-2, May 2001

Hip hop discographies